Erkki Topias Pystynen (born 2 November 1929 in Heinola) is a Finnish politician from the National Coalition Party. 

Pystynen was a professor in Tampere University. He was elected to the parliament in 1975 and served as the speaker from 1983 to 1986. He left the Parliament in 1991.

References 

1929 births
Living people
People from Heinola
National Coalition Party politicians
Speakers of the Parliament of Finland
Members of the Parliament of Finland (1975–79)
Members of the Parliament of Finland (1979–83)
Members of the Parliament of Finland (1983–87)
Members of the Parliament of Finland (1987–91)
Academic staff of the University of Tampere